This is the glossary of Japanese swords, including major terms the casual reader might find useful in understanding articles on Japanese swords. Within definitions, words set in boldface are defined elsewhere in the glossary.

A
 – thin line that runs across the temper line (hamon) to the cutting edge (ha).
 – regular wavy surface grain pattern (jihada). Also known as gassan-hada after the name of a school which usually produced swords of this type.

B
 – an authentically shaped wooden (practice) sword (or other bladed weapon).
 – temper line (hamon) of the blade point (kissaki). (see image) (also see ko-maru)

C
 – black gleaming lines of nie that appear in the ji.
 – distinctly visible mokume-hada with a clearer steel than in similar but coarser patterns.
 – an irregular hamon pattern resembling cloves, with a round upper part and a narrow constricted lower part.
 – a straight sword primarily produced during the ancient period (jokotō).
 – Commonly used as a calque for the broadest definition of (European) long swords.
 – either a nagakatana (due to long blade) or a naginata (due to long handle).

D
 – in context any pair of Japanese swords of differing lengths (daitō and shōtō) worn together.
 – any type of Japanese long sword, the larger in a pair of daishō. Commonly a katana.

F
 – the cutting edge (ha) of the blade point (kissaki). (see image)
 – tapering of the blade from the base (machi) to the point (kissaki)

G
 – see ayasugi-hada.
 – swords produced after 1876. Also the name for the period in sword history from 1876 to the present day, i.e., the period that succeeded the shinshintō period.
 – swordsmiths summoned by the retired Emperor Go-Toba to work at his palace in monthly rotations.
 – the five basic styles of swords which during the kotō period were associated with the provinces: Yamashiro, Yamato, Bizen, Sagami/Sōshū and Mino.
 – pair of parallel grooves running partway up the blade resembling chopsticks.
 – a wave-like outline of the temper line (hamon) made up of similarly sized semicircles.

H
 – the tempered cutting edge of a blade. The side opposite the mune. Also called hasaki or yaiba. (see image)
 – misty spots in the temper line (hamon) resulting from repeated grinding or faulty tempering.
 – notch in the cutting edge (ha), dividing the blade proper from the tang (nakago). (see image)
 – border between the tempered part of the ha (cutting edge) and the untempered part of the rest of the sword; the temper-line. (see image)
 – see ha.
 – patterns and shapes such as lines, streaks, dots and hazy reflections that appear in addition to the grain pattern (jihada) and the temper line (hamon) on the surface of the steel and are a result of sword polishing.
 – see matsukawa-hada.
 – see hiraji.
 – curved surface between ridge (shinogi) and temper line (hamon). Also called hira. If polished, the hiraji appears blue-black. (see image)
 – a nearly flat blade without ridge (shinogi) or yokote. (see image)
 – temper line (hamon) with tempering marks visible around the ridge and near the edge of the blade.
 – see shinogi-zukuri.

I
 – a fully tempered point area (kissaki) because the hamon turns back before reaching the point.
 – a bōshi which turns back in a straight horizontal line with a short kaeri.
 – a short, stubby blade point (kissaki).
 – top ridge of the back edge (mune), the back ridge. (see image)
 – surface grain pattern (jihada) of scattered irregular ovals resembling wood grain. The small/large grain pattern of this type is called ko-itame-hada/ō-itame-hada.

J
 – area between the ridge (shinogi) and the hamon.
 – generally used to refer to the material of the blade.
 – visible surface pattern of the steel resulting from hammering and folding during the construction. (also see masame-hada, mokume-hada, itame-hada and ayasugi-hada)
 – nie that appears in the hiraji.
 – a sword produced before the mid-Heian period. Unlike later blades, these are straight swords. The term is also used to refer to the respective period of swordsmanship which was followed by the kotō period.
 – multiple overlapping clove shaped chōji midare patterns.
 – a bayonet.

K
 – part of the temper line (hamon) that extends from the tip of the bōshi to the back edge (mune).
 – a dagger concealed in the clothing.
 – blade thickness measured across the back edge (mune). (see also motokasane and sakikasane)
Worn thrust through the belt with the blade edge (ha) facing upward. It superseded the older  starting in the Muromachi period, after 1392. Also a (now rare) general term for single-edged blades, see tō.
 – a gunome with a straight top and an overall slant.
 – a variation of the chōji midare  pattern with the peaks resembling tadpoles.
 – a double-edged blade (sword/dagger) of any size or shape.
 – short straight thin radiant black line of nie that appears in the temper-line (hamon).
 – fan-shaped point of the blade; separated from the body of the sword by the yokote. (see image)
 – a skewer for the owner's hair-do, carried in a pocket of the scabbards of katana and wakizashi on the side opposite of the kozuka.
 – any knife, particularly a small utility knife carried in a pocket of the scabbards of katana and wakizashi.
 – see itame-hada.
 – a bōshi that runs parallel to the cutting edge of the point area (kissaki) and then forms a small circle as it turns back towards the back edge (mune).
 – see mokume-hada.
 – diagonal line that separates the point of a blade (kissaki) from the shinogiji and extends the ridge (shinogi) to the back edge (mune) in the kissaki area. (see image)
 – curvature (sori) of the blade with the center of the curve lying  near or inside of the tang (nakago).
 – a pre-Edo period sword as opposed to a shintō. The year of transition is generally taken to be 1596. The term is also used to refer to the respective period of swordsmanship where the lower limit is given by the appearance of curved swords in the mid-Heian period. The kotō period succeeded the jokotō period.
 – handle of a small utility knife (kogatana) carried in a pocket of the scabbards of katana and wakizashi on the side opposite of the kōgai. Also used to refer to the whole knife, i.e. hilt plus blade.
 – Register of masterpiece swords (meibutsu) compiled by the Hon'ami family in the Kyōhō era.

M
 – notches that divide the blade proper from the tang. (also see munemachi and hamachi)
 -straight surface grain pattern (jihada).
 – ten excellent students of Masamune: Gō Yoshihiro, Norishige, Kaneuji, Kinju, Rai Kunitsugu, Hasebe Kunishige, Osafune Kanemitsu, Chogi, Samonji, Sekishi Naotsuna.
 – surface grain pattern (jihada) resembling the bark of a pine tree. A type of ō-mokume-hada or ō-itame-hada with thick chikei. Also known as hijiki-hada.
 – signature, usually engraved on the tang (nakago).
 – swords designated as masterpieces. Sometimes used to refer specifically to swords listed in the Kyōhō Meibutsuchō.
 – a peg of bamboo or horn which passes through the mekugiana to secure the tang in the hilt.
 – hole in the tang (nakago) for the retaining peg (mekugi) that secures the tang in the hilt. (see image)
 – an irregular temper line (hamon). (also see suguha)
 – irregular temper line (midareba) that continues into the point (kissaki).
 – distance from the blade edge (ha) to the back edge (mune). (also see sakihaba and motohaba)
 – see tantō.
 – point at which the yokote, shinogi and ko-shinogi meet. (see image)
 – surface grain pattern (jihada) of small ovals and circles resembling the burl-grain in wood. The small/large grain pattern of this type is called ko-mokume-hada/ō-mokume-hada.
 – blade width (mihaba) at the bottom of the blade (machi).
 – blade thickness (kasane) at the bottom of the blade (machi).
 – back edge of a blade, i.e., the side opposite the cutting edge (ha). (see image)
 – notch in the back edge (mune), dividing the blade proper from the tang (nakago). (see image)

N
 – any sword with a blade longer than a tantō, particularly exceptionally large ones (e.g. nodachi). Also called chōtō.
 – a large sword with a usually katana-sized blade and a very long handle of about equal length. Successor design to the ōdachi/nodachi.
 – pole weapon wielded in large sweeping strokes. Typically with a wide blade, long tang and without yokote. It often has a distinctive carved groove. Also called chōtō. 
 – unpolished part of a blade that is concealed by the hilt. (see image)
 – end of the tang (nakago), i.e., the butt of a blade. (see image)
 – blade length measured from the point to the back edge notch (munemachi).
 – surface grain pattern (jihada) resembling the flesh of a sliced pear (jap. nashi); i.e. essentially fine dense ko-mokume-hada with surface nie throughout.
 – small distinct crystalline particles due to martensite, austenite, pearlite or troostite that appear like twinkling stars.
 – a curved blade with ridge (shinogi).
 – indistinguishable crystalline particles due to martensite, austenite, pearlite or troostite that appear together like a wash of stars.
 – see yō.
Worn across the back.
 – gently waving temper line (hamon).

O
Worn slung from the shoulder.
 – a large grain pattern (jihada).
 – see itame-hada.
 – see mokume-hada.
 – alternative reading of ōdachi.

S
 – blade width (mihaba) at the yokote.
 – blade thickness (kasane) at the yokote.
 – curvature (sori) of the blade with the center of the curve lying  near the point.
 –  bōshi seen  in the works of the three swordsmiths: Osafune Nagamitsu, Kagemitsu and Sanenaga: hamon continues as straight line inside the point (kissaki) area running towards the tip of the blade. Just before reaching the tip, the bōshi turns in a small circle (ko-maru) a short distance to the back edge (mune) remaining inside the kissaki.
 – sword of the Imperial Japanese Army with a metal scabbard (saya) produced from the 1930s to the end of World War II in 1945.
 – a real sword as opposed to unsharpened or wooden practice weapons (bokutou).
 – ridge running along the side of the sword, generally closer to the back (mune) than the cutting edge (ha). (see image)
 – flat surface between ridge (shinogi) and back edge (mune). (see image)
 – a curved blade with yokote and a ridge (shinogi) quite close to the back edge (mune). (see image)
 – period in sword history characterized by the revival of old sword styles, especially those from the Kamakura period. It follows the shintō period and is generally dated from the late 18th century to about 1876, when the wearing of swords was prohibited. The term is also used to denote swords produced in this period.
 – post-Edo period swords produced after the end of the kotō period (after 1596) and before the period of revival of old styles at the end of the 18th century which is known as shinshintō. The term is also used to refer to the respective period of swordsmanship.
 – a curved blade without yokote and a ridge (shinogi) quite close to the back edge (mune); basically shinogi-zukuri without yokote. (see image)
 – any type of Japanese short sword, the smaller in a pair of daishō. Commonly a wakizashi.
 – curvature of the sword measured as the greatest perpendicular distance between the back edge (mune) and the chord connecting the back edge notch (munemachi) with the point of the blade.
 – the overall shape of the blade.
 – straight temper line (hamon). (also see midareba)
 – plain dark spots on the ji that differ considerably from the surface pattern in both color and grain.
 – marks in the temper line (hamon) that resemble the pattern left behind by a broom sweeping over sand.

T
Worn slung across the hip with the blade edge (ha) facing down. Primarily produced in the kotō period.
Usually constructed in flat style (hira-zukuri). (also see tantō, kaiken) Commonly used as a calque for the broadest definition of (European) short swords.
Usually constructed in flat style (hira-zukuri). Also called mijikagatana. (also see tanken, kaiken)
 – single-edged blades (saber/knife) of any size or shape.
 – a tempered spot within the ji not connected to the main temper line (hamon).
 – umbrella term for all single- and double-edged blades of any size and shape.
 – curvature (sori) of the blade in which the center of the curve lies roughly in the center of the blade resembling the horizontal bar of torii.
 – sword guard; generally a round metal plate with a central wedge shaped hole for the blade and if needed up to two smaller holes for the kozuka or kōgai
 – symmetrical double-edged thrusting weapon popular in the Nara and early Heian period. Also a (now rare) general term for double-edged blades, see ken.

U
 – curvature (sori) of the blade with a slight curve toward the cutting edge (ha).
 – misty reflection on the ji or shinogiji usually made of softer steel.

W
Shorter of the two swords worn by warriors in the Edo period.

Y
 – see ha.
 – without turn-back (kaeri); a bōshi that continues directly to the back edge (mune).
 – file marks on the tang (nakago) applied as a kind of additional signature and before engraving the real signature (mei). (see image)
 – activity (hataraki) in the temper line (hamon) that resembles fallen leaves or tiny footprints. After the late Sengoku period (late 16th century) referred to as nioi kuzure.
 – line perpendicular to the ridge (shinogi) which marks off the kissaki from the rest of the blade. (see image)
 – dagger used for cutting through armour. Originally worn thrust vertically through the back of the belt; later carried at the ride side with the hilt to the front and the edge facing up.
 – spot or spots where nie is concentrated on the ji.

See also
List of National Treasures of Japan (crafts-swords)

References

Bibliography

External links

 Nihonto forum
 Glossary of Japanese sword terms
 Japanese Sword Index and Visual Glossary

Samurai weapons and equipment
Japanese swords
Japanese swords
Wikipedia glossaries using unordered lists